"The Bullet Is Not for Firing" is the fourth episode of the third series of the British comedy series Dad's Army. It was originally transmitted on Thursday 2 October 1969.

Synopsis
When the platoon engage a low-flying German plane with rapid fire, a Court of Inquiry is held.

Plot
As the 'all clear' air raid siren blares, Mainwaring and Wilson wake up from a snooze, but both are quick to deny it. As they go into the hall and begin to make some tea, Mainwaring remarks on a low-flying Nazi plane that passed over Walmington. The platoon arrive and Mainwaring asks them to hand in their ammunition, but Jones admits they haven't got any: they wasted it all shooting at the low-flying plane. Godfrey is the only one with a full magazine, because by the time he had got it out of his overcoat, the plane had flown away. Mainwaring decides to report the night's events to GHQ. As the tired platoon prepare to make a cup of tea, Mainwaring bursts their bubble by saying their rifles have to be pulled through and boiled out.

Mainwaring decides to organise a thorough search around the area to find the missing cartridges. As they leave to supervise the rifle maintenance, Jones is having a bit of trouble removing his pull-through, and several methods are tried, including tying it to the banister and pulling it out. However, this destroys the banister, much to the Verger's chagrin. When Mainwaring ties it to a thicker pillar, the string breaks and it becomes impossible to remove. Mrs Pike arrives to take Frank home, and solves Jones' rifle problem by pulling the string out from the other end.

Later, the empty cartridges are collected. Mainwaring explains that GHQ has decided to hold a Court of Inquiry to find out what really happened. Wilson is sceptical, but Mainwaring reminds him that honesty is the best policy. The two officers overseeing the Inquiry, Captain Cutts and Captain Pringle, are keen to get it over and done with as soon as possible, as they have made alternative arrangements.

At the church hall, the platoon are busy preparing for the Inquiry. Jones arrives in his old "red coat" uniform that he wore under Lord Kitchener, and Frazer brings in a sword that he owned back in the Navy, as it was standard procedure for swords to be laid on the table during inquiries. Mainwaring finds this unnecessary, however. Just before Cutts and Pringle arrive, Pike enters with a box of ammunition from HQ, and Mainwaring quickly hands it out to the men. Jones lines the witnesses up outside, and they prepare to begin the Court of Inquiry. However, they are twice interrupted by members of a choir who have come for the Vicar's practice. Through the course of the Inquiry, it is revealed that Jones gave the order to fire.

Suddenly, thunder crashes, and the platoon rush in, not wanting to be soaked. Cutts and Pringle, who are becoming quite irritated, decide that the platoon should demonstrate what happened. Jones states that as soon as he spotted the plane, he gave the order "shoot". Mainwaring corrects him by saying "fire", but the platoon follow his command and shoot the ceiling, bringing it down on top of them. Mainwaring suggests they meet same time, same place, next week.

Cast

Arthur Lowe as Captain Mainwaring
John Le Mesurier as Sergeant Wilson
Clive Dunn as Lance Corporal Jones
John Laurie as Private Frazer
James Beck as Private Walker
Arnold Ridley as Private Godfrey
Ian Lavender as Private Pike
Janet Davies as Mrs Pike
Frank Williams as The Vicar
Edward Sinclair as The Verger
Harold Bennett as Mr Blewitt
May Warden as Mrs Dowding
Michael Knowles as Captain Cutts
Tim Barrett as Captain Pringle
Fred Tomlinson as Choir member
Kate Forge as Choir member
Eilidh McNab as Choir member
Andrew Daye as Choir member
Arthur Lewis as Choir member

Notes
This episode was the first to feature Edward Sinclair as the Verger. He had previously appeared in "The Showing Up of Corporal Jones", but was credited and referred to as the caretaker and had not donned his trademark black cassock and yellow duster.
This episode features the only reference to the Axis's anti-Judaism in the entire show, when Walker says of the German aircraft, "He loosed off his machine gun at Marks & Spencers.   A Jewish firm, you know."
Mainwaring says the ammunition is "point three-oh-oh" calibre, indicating that the platoon's rifles are the American-made M1917 Enfield rather than the similar looking Pattern 1914 Enfield, which was in .303 British calibre.  However, the rifles are not painted with a red stripe as was the case for real M1917s in British service.
In opening the Inquiry, Mainwaring says 75 rounds were lost, which would be correct if the 15 men had fired 5 rounds each. However, it should only be 70 rounds, since Godfrey did not fire and said he still had his rounds.

Further reading

External links

    

Dad's Army radio episodes
Dad's Army (series 3) episodes
1969 British television episodes